Rott is a river of Bavaria, Germany. It flows into the Ammersee, which is drained by the Amper, near Dießen am Ammersee.

See also
List of rivers of Bavaria

References

Rivers of Bavaria
Rivers of Germany